Thereva bakeri is a species of stiletto flies in the family Therevidae.

References

Therevidae
Articles created by Qbugbot
Insects described in 1923